Geoffrey Marks (15 November 1864 – 25 August 1938) was an English first-class cricketer active 1894–1900 who played for Middlesex. He was born in Thornton Heath, Surrey; died in Newnham, Hampshire.

References

1864 births
1938 deaths
English cricketers
Middlesex cricketers